Khudaydatov or Hudaydatov (Russian: Худайдатов, Hebrew: חודיידטוב) is a Jewish-Bukharan surname. The last name comes from the Persian name "Khudoydot", which means "God given". The Hebrew equivalent of the name is Yonatan (יהונתן; Jonathan).

See also
 Sarit Hadad (born Sarah Hodadetova), Israeli singer

Jewish surnames